'Lugo-Viña' is a surname of Spanish origin, mostly found in the Canary Islands and Puerto Rico. 
It descends from the union of two noble families: Lugo and Viña. 

The Lugo family originated in the Galician town of Lugo and arrived in Tenerife in the 15th century with Alonso Fernández de Lugo, the conqueror of the island. 

The Viña family originated from Italy and arrived in Tenerife in the 16th century with Mateo Viña y Negrón, a merchant and landowner. 
Some well-known people with this surname are: 

- Francisco Estanislao Timoteo de Lugo Viña y Molina (1752-1809), a Spanish nobleman and scholar of the Enlightenment. 

- Teobaldo Power y Lugo-Viña (1848-1884), a Spanish composer, pianist and music teacher known for his Cantos Canarios. 

- Eduardo Lugo-Viña (born 1947), a Puerto Rican entrepreneur and President of Lugo-Viña, Inc., a technical services company.

References

External links 
 Lugo-Viña, Inc. | San Juan (Puerto Rico) | Eduardo Lugo-Viña. https://www.todosbiz.com/PR/lugo-vi%C3%B1a-inc_2P 
 Teobaldo Power Lugo-Viña | Real Academia de la Historia. https://dbe.rah.es/biografias/10146/teobaldo-power-lugo-vina